FK Kurši is a floorball team based in Liepāja, Latvia playing in the Latvian Floorball League.

External links
 FK Kurši official website

Sport in Liepāja
Floorball in Latvia
Latvian floorball teams